The National Catholic Register is a Catholic newspaper in the United States. It was founded on November 8, 1927, by Matthew J. Smith as the national edition of the Denver Catholic Register. The Register's current owner is the Eternal Word Television Network, Inc. of Irondale, Alabama, which also owns the Catholic News Agency.

Content includes news and features from the United States, the Vatican, and worldwide, on such topics as culture, education, books, arts, and entertainment, as well as interviews. Online content includes various blogs and breaking news.

The Registers print edition is published (bi-weekly, 26 times a year). Tom Wehner has been the managing editor since 2009. Jeanette DeMelo became editor in chief in 2012.

History
It was founded on November 8, 1927, by Matthew J. Smith as the national edition of the Denver Catholic Register, with headquarters in Denver. For a time in the 1930s, the Register had a chain of Catholic newspapers.

Patrick Frawley's Twin Circle Publishing Co. purchased the financially struggling National Catholic Register in 1970, changing its editorial focus from progressive to conservative. At the point of sale, the paper had a circulation of 112,000. Frawley sold the paper to the Legion of Christ in 1995.

Eternal Word Television Network acquired the paper from the Legionaries of Christ in 2011.

In 2013, the Register had a print circulation of 24,706.

The 2017 Catholic Press Association awards named the Register Newspaper of the Year.

In 2021, the Register had an average print circulation of 43,117 based on its 2021 Statement of Ownership on file at the USPS.

Editorial position
According to Thomas Tweed, director of the Ansari Institute of Global Engagement with Religion at the University of Notre Dame, "I think the same thing that has happened in American political life and media has happened to some extent to Catholics. Progressive Catholics read Commonweal and the National Catholic Reporter, and traditionalist Catholics watch EWTN and read newsletters from the Blue Army."

See also
 Catholic News Agency

References

Publications established in 1927
Catholic newspapers
Conservative media in the United States
National newspapers published in the United States